2005 Ireland rugby union tour of Japan. Eleven Ireland players, including their captain Brian O'Driscoll, plus their coach Eddie O'Sullivan were included in the British & Irish Lions squad for their tour of New Zealand. As a result, the Ireland squad for this tour featured nine previously uncapped players and an interim coach.

Touring party

Manager: Niall O'Donovan 
Assistant Manager: Michael Bradley
Assistant Manager: Mark McCall 
Captain: David Humphreys

Backs
(*) = international test debuts

Forwards
(*) = international test debuts

Matches

Japan: 15.Goshi Tachikawa, 14.Daisuke Ohata , 13.Reuben Parkinson, 12.Yukio Motoki, 11.Hiroki Mizuno, 10.Kyohei Morita, 9.Wataru Murata, 8.Takuro Miuchi (capt.), 7.Ryota Asano Inose, 6.Hare Makiri, 5.Jamie Washington, 4.Takanori Kumagae, 3.Ryo Yamamura, 2.Ken Tsukagoshi, 1.Hiroshi Takahashi,  – replacements: 17.Kenji Kasai, 18.Shigeyasu Takagi, 19.Hitoshi Ono, 20.Shota Goto, 21.Tomoaki Nakai, 22.Teppei Tomioka    –  No entry : 16.Masakazu Nakabayashi
Ireland: 15.Girvan Dempsey, 14.Tommy Bowe, 13.Gavin Duffy, 12.Kevin Maggs, 11.Anthony Horgan, 10.David Humphreys (capt.), 9.Peter Stringer, 8.Roger Wilson, 7.Johnny O'Connor, 6.Alan Quinlan, 5.Matt McCullough, 4.Leo Cullen, 3.Simon Best, 2.Frankie Sheahan, 1.Marcus Horan,  – replacements: 16.Bernard Jackman, 17.Reggie Corrigan, 18.Trevor Hogan, 19.Eric Miller, 20.Kieran Campbell, 21.Jeremy Staunton, 22.David Quinlan 

Japan: 15.Goshi Tachikawa, 14.Daisuke Ohata, 13.Reuben Parkinson, 12.Yukio Motoki, 11.Hirotoki Onozawa, 10.Keiji Hirose, 9.Wataru Murata, 8.Takuro Miuchi, 7.Ryota Asano Inose, 6.Hare Makiri, 5.Takanori Kumagae, 4.Hajime Kiso, 3.Ryo Yamamura, 2.Masakazu Nakabayashi, 1.Shigeyasu Takagi ,  – replacements: 16.Ken Tsukagoshi, 17.Kenji Kasai, 18.Tomoaki Nakai, 19.Takeomi Ito, 20.Shota Goto, 21.Teppei Tomioka, 22.Ayumu Goromaru 
Ireland: 15.Girvan Dempsey, 14.Tommy Bowe, 13.Gavin Duffy, 12.David Quinlan, 11.Anthony Horgan, 10.David Humphreys (capt.), 9.Peter Stringer, 8.Eric Miller, 7.David Wallace, 6.Denis Leamy, 5.Matt McCullough, 4.Leo Cullen, 3.Simon Best, 2.Frankie Sheahan, 1.Marcus Horan,  – replacements: 16.Bernard Jackman, 17.Reggie Corrigan, 18.Trevor Hogan, 19.Alan Quinlan, 20.Kieran Campbell, 21.Jeremy Staunton, 22.Kieran Lewis

References

Ireland national rugby union team tours
Rugby union tours of Japan
Ireland tour
Ire
Ire